Phonarellus is a genus of crickets in the family Gryllidae and tribe Gryllini.  Species can be found in mainland Asia, Japan and tropical Africa.

Species 
Phonarellus includes the following species:
subgenus Phonarellus Gorochov, 1983
Phonarellus afganicus Gorochov, 1983
Phonarellus erythrocephalus (Serville, 1838)
Phonarellus flavipes Xia, Liu & Yin, 1991
Phonarellus humeralis (Walker, 1871)
Phonarellus minor (Chopard, 1959) - type species (as Gymnogryllus minor Chopard)
Phonarellus nitidus (Gorochov, 1992)
Phonarellus ritsemae (Saussure, 1877)
subgenus Semaphorellus Gorochov, 1983
Phonarellus kareni Otte, Toms & Cade, 1988
Phonarellus lucens Walker, 1869
Phonarellus mistshenkoi Gorochov, 1983
Phonarellus miurus Saussure, 1877

References

External links

Ensifera genera
crickets
Orthoptera of Asia
Orthoptera of Africa